Léonie Thévenot d'Aunet (2 July 1820 – 3 March 1879) was a French author, novelist, playwright and Arctic explorer.<ref>Léonie d'Aunet gives 2 July 1820 as her date of birth, her mother gave 1 January. Alessandra Grillo, "Le Grand Tour de Léonie d'Aunet – Voyage d'une Parisienne aux pays boréaux" , Revue Astrolabe, no. 21, September–October 2008.</ref>

 Biography 

D'Aunet was born to Auguste-François-Michel Thévenot d'Aunet an officer of a military squadron from Québec, and d'Henriette-Joséphine d'Orémieulx. She married the painter François-Auguste Biard (1798–1882) on 23 July 1840 in Paris.

In 1838 the corvette La Recherche (1838–1839), under the command of Joseph Paul Gaimard, undertook a scientific expedition to Spitzbergen, to explore the Arctic. D'Aunet was by this time already living with Biard, and agreed to persuade her future husband to accept the position of official painter for the expedition, on condition that she be allowed to accompany him. She traveled with Biard across Belgium, Holland and Norway, before leaving Hammerfest, the northernmost city in Scandinavia, and returned after spending several weeks at Spitzbergen. She was the first woman to participate in a scientific expedition to the northern regions, On return, her letters were published, in serial form, in Revue de Paris.

Their relationship eased Hugo's life, inspiring him to the numerous poems of which one finds trace in Les Contemplations. Her seven year liaison was interrupted by Victor Hugo's exile after the coup d'état by Napoleon III on December 2, 1851.

The commissioner let Hugo leave after hesitating, when Hugo invoked his inviolability as a peer of France, but Leonie was arrested and taken to the prison at Saint-Lazare.

After two months, she was transferred to the Convent of the Ladies of Saint Michael, where Adèle Foucher (wife of Victor Hugo), who was glad to see a competitor to Juliette Drouet, decided to visit Leonie. In the meanwhile Louis-Philippe I awarded a commission to her husband to appease him.

 Literary career 

On September 10, 1845, she entered the convent of the Augustines, where she remained for about six months. Once released, she made frequent visits to Hugo's home. Adèle Hugo helped her, in exchange for clothing advice and interior decoration, to launch her literary career. Some even affirmed that most of her books were due to Victor Hugo When Hugo left for exile, Adèle dissuaded her from joining him, but their correspondence did not cease. He, feeling responsible for the children of Leonie, upon his return from exile, regularly sent her money until his death.

She entered into the literary career under her maiden name, after her legal separation from her husband in 1855. She began by publishing, as a book with Hachette, the account of her journey to Spitzbergen under the title of Voyage d'une femme au Spitzberg. This work was followed by the Un Mariage en province (1856), published in La Presse; The Vengeance (1857), Étiennette, Silvère, The Secret (1859), The Heritage of the Marquis d'Elsigny for the Library of the Railways from Hachette Publishers, and which earned her a distinguished place in the world of letters.

 Playwright 

D'Aunet also devoted herself to the theater by writing the drama Jane Osborn, performed by Lucie Mabire, on 30 January 1856 at the Porte de Saint-Martin theatre.

 Family 

She left a son, known as Biard d'Aunet, who married Miss de Lestang-Parade. She also had a daughter, who died in 1897, who bore in literature the pseudonym  ("Sparkle") and who successively married Viscount Peyronny and Baron Double de Saint-Lambert.

 Works 

 Works on WorldCat
 Une place à la cour, comédie en 1 acte, Poissy, Arbieu, 1854.
 Voyage d'une femme au Spitzberg, Paris, Hachette, 1854.
 Jane Osborn, drame en quatre actes, Paris, A. Taride, 1855.
 Un mariage en province, Paris, W. Gerhard, 1856.
 Étiennette ; Silvère ; Le Secret, nouvelles, Paris, L. Hachette, 1859.
 L'Héritage du marquis d'Elvigny. Les deux Légendes d'Hardenstein, Paris, L. Hachette, 1863.
 Une vengeance, Paris, Hachette, 1857.

References

 Further reading 
 Victor Hugo, Lettres de Victor Hugo à Léonie Biard, Jean Gaudon éd., Paris, Blaizot, 1990
 Françoise Lapeyre, Léonie d'Aunet, Paris, JC Lattès, 2005
 , Le Livre d'or des femmes : cent-douze biographies, Paris, A. Lacroix, 1870, pp. 29–30, 326 pp.
 Gustave Vapereau, Dictionnaire universel des contemporains : contenant toutes les personnes notables de a France et des pays étrangers'', Paris, Hachette, 1870, .

External links

Female explorers
French women novelists
1820 births
1879 deaths
19th-century French women writers
Hugo family